Saint-Genix-les-Villages is a commune in the Savoie department in the Auvergne-Rhône-Alpes region in south-eastern France. It was established on 1 January 2019 by merger of the former communes of Saint-Genix-sur-Guiers (the seat), Gresin and Saint-Maurice-de-Rotherens.

See also
Communes of the Savoie department

References

Saintgenixlesvillages